Abudefduf also known as the sergeant-majors is a genus of fish in the family Pomacentridae.
 
The name is from Arabic abu, "the one with"; and def, "side", and the intensive plural ending -duf. The name thus means "the one with prominent sides".

General biology 
The approximately 20 species of Abudefduf may be divided into planktivores and benthivores and three broadly pantropical clades. Two of the Abudefduf clades are primarily benthivorous and a third clade is composed of planktivores and is the most species-rich. Most diversification has occurred in the last 10 million years within this genus across all clades.

Species
The following 21 species are recognized in the genus Abudefduf:
 Abudefduf abdominalis (Quoy & Gaimard, 1825) (Green damselfish)
 Abudefduf bengalensis (Bloch, 1787) (Bengal sergeant)
 Abudefduf caudobimaculatus Okada & Ikeda, 1939
 Abudefduf concolor (T. N. Gill, 1862)    
 Abudefduf conformis J. E. Randall & Earle, 1999    
 Abudefduf declivifrons (T. N. Gill, 1862) (Mexican nightsergeant)
 Abudefduf hoefleri (Steindachner, 1881) (African sergeant)   
 Abudefduf lorenzi Hensley & G. R. Allen, 1977 (Black-tail sergeant)  
 Abudefduf margariteus (G. Cuvier, 1830) (Pearly sergeant)   
 Abudefduf natalensis Hensley & J. E. Randall, 1983 (Natal sergeant)   
 Abudefduf nigrimargo Wibowo, Koeda, Muto & Motomura, 2018 (Black margined-scale sergeant)  
 Abudefduf notatus (F. Day, 1870) (Yellowtail sergeant)
 Abudefduf saxatilis (Linnaeus, 1758) (Sergeant-major)
 Abudefduf septemfasciatus (G. Cuvier, 1830) (Banded sergeant)
 Abudefduf sexfasciatus (Lacépède, 1801) (Scissortail sergeant)
 Abudefduf sordidus (Forsskål, 1775) (Blackspot sergeant)
 Abudefduf sparoides (Quoy & Gaimard, 1825) (False-eye sergeant)
 Abudefduf taurus (Müller & Troschel, 1848) (Night sergeant)    
 Abudefduf troschelii (T. N. Gill, 1862) (Panamic sergeant-major)
 Abudefduf vaigiensis (Quoy & Gaimard, 1825) (Indo-Pacific sergeant)
 Abudefduf whitleyi G. R. Allen & D. R. Robertson, 1974 (Whitley's sergeant)

Gallery

References

 
Pomacentrinae
Marine fish genera
Taxa named by Peter Forsskål